"Medicina" (English: "Medicine") is a song recorded by Brazilian singer Anitta. It was released as a single on July 20, 2018, through Warner Music Brasil. The song was written by Anitta, Mauricio Montaner, Jon Leone, Mario Cáceres and Andy Clay.

Background and release
In 2017, Anitta began expanding her career to Latin America and other markets. That year, she announced a project titled CheckMate, which consisted of releasing a new song a month, in English, Spanish or Portuguese, along with a music video. She debuted with the project "Will I See You" produced by Poo Bear, which became her debut single in English as lead artist. In October, she released the single "Is That for Me", a collaboration with Swedish Alesso. For the November release, the singer recorded "Downtown" a collaboration with the Colombian singer J Balvin. The last single of the project was "Vai Malandra", a song daring funk carioca and trap, according to the artist, it would be the coup "checkmate" to complete the project. Early in 2018, Anitta was featured on J Balvin's "Machika" and also released a single on her own titled "Indecente".

On June 20, 2018, with the launch of Instagram's new video platform, Anitta announced she would begin promoting her next single by exposing to the world how is the process of picking up a single. Within the format of a webseries, Anitta began releasing a number of chapters in order to allow fans to witness how the next single was going to be chosen. Anitta was in doubt between "Medicina" and the still unreleased "Veneno" but she ultimately released the first. A total of 8 chapters were released and it showcased marketing estrategies, the making of the music videos, interviews with the writers and producers of both tracks and a voting including Warner Music executives, both her national and international teens, as well as other artists such as Alesso, Lele Pons and Rudy Mancuso.

Music video

Official video
Directed by 36 Grados, the accompanying music video premiered on Vevo the same day of the single release. The video was shot during July, 2018, in a total of six different places - Colombia, Hong Kong, India, United States, South Africa and Brazil - and features children from each country dancing to the song Anitta shot her scenes in Colombia on July 2, 2018, and then the rest of the crew traveled to the other countries in order to shoot the rest of the scenes. The final cut of the video was completed two days before official release.

Upon its release, the video gathered 10 million views on its first day.

Spotify video
A music video premiered on Spotify's mobile app on August 10, 2018, on the newly relaunched ¡Viva Latino! playlist, and became her second vertical video to premiere as a Spotify exclusive. The vertical music video features Anitta singing in front of the camera.

Track listing
Digital download
 "Medicina" – 2:21

Charts

Certifications

Credits and personnel
Vocals – Anitta
Songwriting – Anitta, Mauricio Montaner, Jon Leone, Mario Cáceres and Andy Clay
Production – Jon Leone

References

2018 songs
2018 singles
Spanish-language songs
Latin pop songs
Reggaeton songs
Anitta (singer) songs
Songs written by Anitta (singer)
Vertically-oriented music videos
Songs written by Mau Montaner